Viscount Astor, of Hever Castle in the County of Kent, is a title in the Peerage of the United Kingdom. It was created in 1917 for the financier and statesman William Waldorf Astor, 1st Baron Astor. He had already been created Baron Astor, of Hever Castle in the County of Kent, in 1916, also in the Peerage of the United Kingdom.

His eldest son Waldorf, the second Viscount, was the husband of Nancy Astor, Viscountess Astor, the first woman to sit in the House of Commons. , the titles are held by their grandson, the fourth Viscount, who succeeded his father in 1966. He is one of the ninety-two elected hereditary peers that remain in the House of Lords after the passing of the House of Lords Act 1999, and sits as a Conservative.

John Jacob Astor, 1st Baron Astor of Hever, was the third son of the first Viscount. This peerage, Baron Astor of Hever, was a separate creation in 1956 and not to be confused with the Viscount's subsidiary title of Baron Astor, of Hever Castle in the County of Kent. The Hon. David Astor CH, the Hon. Michael Astor and the Hon. Sir Jakie Astor, younger sons of the second Viscount, all gained prominence in public life.

The family seat is Ginge Manor, near Wantage, Oxfordshire.

The first three Viscounts Astor are buried within the Astor family chapel (also known as the Octagon Temple) at the Cliveden estate near Taplow, Buckinghamshire.

Baron Astor (1916)
William Waldorf Astor, 1st Baron Astor (1848–1919) (created Viscount Astor in 1917)

Viscounts Astor (1917)
William Waldorf Astor, 1st Viscount Astor (1848–1919)
Waldorf Astor, 2nd Viscount Astor (1879–1952)
William Waldorf Astor, 3rd Viscount Astor (1907–1966)
William Waldorf Astor, 4th Viscount Astor (born 1951)

The heir apparent is the present holder's eldest son, the Hon. William Waldorf Astor (born 1979).
The heir apparent's heir apparent is his son, William Waldorf Astor (born 2012).

See also
Baron Astor of Hever
Astor family

References

External links 
Cracroft's Peerage page

 
1917 establishments in the United Kingdom
Noble titles created in 1917
Viscountcies in the Peerage of the United Kingdom
Viscount Astor
People from Hever, Kent